Bresciani is an Italian surname meaning "Brescian", "of Brescia" or "from Brescia". Notable people with the surname include:

Acaste Bresciani (1882–1969), Italian Roman Catholic priest and writer
Andrea Bresciani (1923–2006), comics artist and illustrator
Antonio Bresciani (1720–1817), Italian painter and engraver
Ardito Bresciani (1899–1948), Italian cyclist
Costantino Bresciani Turroni (1882–1963), Italian economist and statistician
Dean L. Bresciani, American university president
Dick Bresciani (1938–2014), American baseball executive
Edda Bresciani (born 1930), Italian egyptologist
Giorgio Bresciani (born 1969), Italian footballer
Michael Bresciani (born 1994), Italian cyclist
Henrique Bresciani (born 1992), Entrepreneur and digital marketer 

Italian toponymic surnames